The Obice da 105/14 modello 18 was a howitzer used by Italy during World War II. The howitzer was designed by Schneider in 1906. It was chosen by the Italian Regio Esercito to serve as their new field gun, but licence production by Ansaldo was slow. Some more were produced during the interwar years, but the captured Austrian Obice da 100/17 was generally considered to be superior.

It was originally designed to be towed by horses with wooden-spoked wheels. Some weapons may have been modernized for tractor-towing with steel-spoked wheels and pneumatic tires. For transport the box trail was supported by a small limber. Howitzers captured by the Germans after the Italian surrender in 1943 were given the designation of 10.5 cm leichte Feldhaubitze 326(i), although it is unknown to what extent they were actually used.

Both references listed below believe this gun was developed in the 1930s, but this seems unlikely given the photographic evidence of the designation as modello 18. The box trail would also be very old-fashioned for a gun designed that late.

Footnotes

References 
 Chamberlain, Peter & Gander, Terry. Light and Medium Field Artillery. New York: Arco, 1975
 Cappellano, Filippo. "Le artiglierie terrestri dell'Ansaldo nella Grande Guerra" in Storia Militare Nr 51, December 1997, 4-13
 Gander, Terry and Chamberlain, Peter. Weapons of the Third Reich: An Encyclopedic Survey of All Small Arms, Artillery and Special Weapons of the German Land Forces 1939-1945. New York: Doubleday, 1979

External links
 Photo essay on the Obice da 105/14 modello 18

 

World War II field artillery
World War II weapons of Italy
World War II artillery of Italy
105 mm artillery
Gio. Ansaldo & C. artillery